Jamie Cook (born 1985) is an English guitarist and songwriter.

Jamie Cook may also refer to:

 Jamie Cook (footballer) (born 1979), English association football player
 Jamie Cook (rower) (born 1992), English rower
 Jamie Cook (rugby league), New Zealand rugby league footballer